This is a list of Spanish television related events in 1989.

Events 
 13 January: Luis Solana is appointed Director General of RTVE.
 28 February: Canal Sur, Andalucia’s Regional Television channel is launched..
 2 May: Telemadrid, Community of Madrid’s Regional Television channel is launched.
 25 August: The Council of Ministers issues broadcasting licence to the TV Channels Antena 3, Telecinco and Canal +. Doing so, private commercial channels establish in Spain for the first time.
 9 October: Canal 9, Valencian Community’s Regional Television channel is launched.
 1 December: TVE Internacional the international broadcasting of the state-owned TV channel is launched.

Debuts

Television shows

La 1

Ending this year

La 1

Foreign series debuts in Spain

Births 
 29 May - Aura Garrido, actress.
 11 August - Úrsula Corberó, actress.
 25 August - Carlos Serrano, actor.
 5 November - Daniel Retuerta, actor.
 26 December - Víctor Palmero, actor.

Deaths 
26 July - José Vivó, actor, 73.
 8 August - Antonio Garisa, actor, 73.
 21 December - Inma de Santis, actress & hostess, 30.

See also
1989 in Spain
List of Spanish films of 1989

References 

1989 in Spanish television